Fiona Geaves (born 6 December 1967, in Gloucester, United Kingdom) is a former professional squash player from England. She played on the professional tour from 1987 to 2006, winning six tour titles, reaching a career-high ranking of World No. 5 in 2001, and remaining in the world's top-20 for an unbroken stretch of 19 years.

Geaves won the British National Squash Championship title in 1995.

At the 2002 Commonwealth Games in Manchester, Geaves won Bronze Medals in both the women's doubles and mixed doubles.

Now Fiona works at the Heights Casino in Brooklyn, New York. She is the head coach and has started a doubles career with fellow coach Meredith Quick.

World Team Championships

Finals: 3 (0 title, 3 runner-up)

See also
 Official Women's Squash World Ranking

External links 
 
 Page at Squashpics.com
 Article of Geaves retirement at Squashsite.co.uk

1967 births
Living people
English female squash players
Commonwealth Games medallists in squash
Commonwealth Games bronze medallists for England
Squash players at the 2002 Commonwealth Games
Medallists at the 2002 Commonwealth Games